Terry Buchanan (born June 2, 1993) is an American professional basketball coach for the Kalamazoo Galaxy of TBL. He played four seasons of college basketball for the Rhode Island Rams.

College
Buchanan announced on September 21, 2010 would compete for the Rhode Island Rams.

Coaching Career
After graduating from Rhode Island, Buchanan spent three seasons as an assistant coach for Kalamazoo Central, helping the team win back-to-back Class A Southwest Michigan District championships from 2015-2016 seasons. In 2017, Buchanan rejoined the Rhode Island Rams as a member of its coaching staff and in 2019 was named as an assistant coach.  

On November 16, 2022, the Kalamazoo Galaxy of The Basketball League announced Buchanan as the team's first head coach.

References

External links
Rhode Island Rams bio

1993 births
Living people
Basketball players from Michigan
Point guards
Rhode Island Rams men's basketball players
Sportspeople from Kalamazoo, Michigan